The 1949–50 Copa México was the 34th staging of the Copa México, the 7th staging in the professional era.

The competition started on July 9, 1950, and concluded on August 6, 1950, with the final, in which Atlas lifted the trophy for the second time ever with a 3–1 victory over Veracruz.

This edition was played by 14 teams, in a knock-out stage, in a single match.

First round

Played July 9

|}

Bye:  Asturias F.C.,  América,  Guadalajara,  Club España,  Tampico and  Veracruz,

Second round

Played July 16

|}

Bye:  Atlante and  Atlas

Third round

Played July 23

|}

Bye:  Tampico and  Veracruz

Semifinals

Played July 30

|}

Play-off

Played August 1

|}

Final

Played August 6

|}

References
Mexico - Statistics of Copa México in season 1949/1950. (RSSSF)

1949-50
1949–50 in Mexican football
1949–50 domestic association football cups